Breira, Algeria is a town and commune in Chlef Province, Algeria. According to the 1998 census it has a population of 11,808.

References

Communes of Chlef Province